The Blue fleet refers to civilian vehicles held by the Canadian Department of National Defence and the Canadian Forces which may or may not be taken off-road.

Canadian Forces Reserves

Most of these vehicles are for re-cruitment or transport within Canada.

Canadian Forces Military Police

These vehicles are used on Canadian Forces bases and all are in Canada.

See also
 Green fleet
 White fleet

References

Canadian Armed Forces